This list of prehistoric amphibians is an attempt to create a comprehensive listing of all genera from the fossil record that have ever been considered to be amphibians, excluding purely vernacular terms. The list includes all commonly accepted genera, but also genera that are now considered invalid, doubtful (nomina dubia), or were not formally published (nomina nuda), as well as junior synonyms of more established names, and genera that are no longer considered amphibians. Modern forms are excluded from this list. The list currently includes 454 names.

Naming conventions and terminology
Naming conventions and terminology follow the International Code of Zoological Nomenclature. Technical terms used include:
 Junior synonym: A name which describes the same taxon as a previously published name. If two or more genera are formally designated and the type specimens are later assigned to the same genus, the first to be published (in chronological order) is the senior synonym, and all other instances are junior synonyms. Senior synonyms are generally used, except by special decision of the ICZN, but junior synonyms cannot be used again, even if deprecated. Junior synonymy is often subjective, unless the genera described were both based on the same type specimen.
Nomen nudum (Latin for "naked name"): A name that has appeared in print but has not yet been formally published by the standards of the ICZN. Nomina nuda (the plural form) are invalid, and are therefore not italicized as a proper generic name would be. If the name is later formally published, that name is no longer a nomen nudum and will be italicized on this list. Often, the formally published name will differ from any nomina nuda that describe the same specimen.
Nomen oblitum (Latin for "forgotten name"): A name that has not been used in the scientific community for more than fifty years after its original proposal.
Preoccupied name: A name that is formally published, but which has already been used for another taxon. This second use is invalid (as are all subsequent uses) and the name must be replaced. As preoccupied names are not valid generic names, they will also go unitalicized on this list.
Nomen dubium (Latin for "dubious name"): A name describing a fossil with no unique diagnostic features. As this can be an extremely subjective and controversial designation, this term is not used on this list.

A

B

C

D

E

Ecolsonia
Elfridia
Elginerpeton
Embolomeri
Enneabatrachus
Eocaecilia
Eocyclotosaurus
Eodiscoglossus
Eogyrinus
Eopelobates
Eorhinophrynus
Eoscapherpeton
Eoscopus
Eoxenopoides
Erpetocephalus
Erpetosaurus
Eryops
Eryosuchus
Erythrobatrachus
Estesina
Eugyrinus
Eupelor
Euryodus
Eyrosuchus

F
Fayella
Fedexia
Ferganobatrachus

G

Gaudrya
Georgenthalia
Gephyrostegus
Gerrothorax
Gerobatrachus
Gobiates
Gobiatoides
Gobiops
Gonioglyptus
Gosgriffius
Greererpeton

H
Habrosaurus
Hadrokkosaurus
Hapsidopareion
Hatzegobatrachus
Hemprichisaurus
Heptasaurus
Horezmia
Hylaeobatrachus
Hyperkynodon
Hynerpeton

I
Icanosaurus
Ichthyostega
Indobenthosuchus
Indobrachyops
Indolyrocephalus
Inflectosaurus
Inflectosuchus
Intasuchus
Iratusaurus
Iridotriton
Isodectes
Itemirella

J
Jammerbergia
Jakubsonia
Jeholotriton

K

Kamacops
Karaurus
Keraterpeton
Keratobrachyops
Kestrosaurus
Kizylkuma
Koalliella
Kokartus
Komatosuchus
Konzukovia
Koolasuchus
Koskinonodon
Kourerpeton
Kryostega
Kuttycephalus

L

Labyrinthodontia
Laccocephalus
Laccosaurus
Laccotriton
Lafonius
Laidleria
Lapillopsis
Latiscopus
Latonia
Leiocephalikon
Lepterpeton
Lethiscus
Liaobatrachus
Liaoxitriton
Limnerpeton
Limnoiketes
Limnogyrinus
Lisserpeton
Lithobatrachus
Llankibatrachus
Llistrofus
Longiscitula
Loxomma
Luzocephalus
Lydekkerina
Lyrocephaliscus
Lysorophus

M

N
Nannaroter
Nannospongylus
Nanolania
Neldasaurus
Neusibatrachus
Nevobatrachus
Nezpercius
Nigerpeton
Notobatrachus
Notobrachiops

O

Odenwaldia
Odonterpeton
Odontosaurus
Oestocephalus
Oligosemia
Onchiodon
Ophiderpeton
Opisthotriton
Obruchevichthys
Orthophyia
Ossinodus
Osteophorus
Ostodolepis

P

Q
Quasicaecilia
Quasicyclotosaurus

R

Rileymillerus
Rewana
Rhadalognathus
Rhadinosteus
Rhineceps
Rhinesuchoides
Rhinesuchus
Rhinophrynus
Rhynchonkos
Rhytidosteus
Ricnodon
Rotaurisaurus
Rubricacaecilia

S

T

U
Uranocentrodon
Urocordylus
Utaherpeton

V
Valdotriton
Vanastega
Ventastega
Vieraella
Vigilius
Volgasaurus
Volgasuchus
Vulcanobatrachus

W

Wantzosaurus
Watsonisuchus
Wealdenbatrachus
Wellesaurus
Wetlugasaurus
Whatcheeria

X
Xenobrachyops
Xenotosaurus
Xestorrhytias

Y
Yarengia
Ymeria
Yuanansuchus
Yizhoubatrachus

Z

Zaphrissa
Zatrachys
Zygosaurus

See also 

 Amphibian
 Labyrinthodontia
 Lepospondyli
 Lissamphibia 
 Temnospondyli

 List
Prehistoric amphibians
Amphibians